Phospholamban, also known as PLN or PLB, is a micropeptide protein that in humans is encoded by the PLN gene. Phospholamban is a 52-amino acid integral membrane protein that regulates the calcium (Ca2+) pump in cardiac muscle cells.

Function 

This protein is found as a pentamer and is a major substrate for the cAMP-dependent protein kinase (PKA) in cardiac muscle. In the unphosphorylated state, phospholamban is an inhibitor of cardiac muscle sarcoplasmic reticulum Ca2+-ATPase (SERCA2) which transports calcium from cytosol into the sarcoplasmic reticulum. When phosphorylated (by PKA) - disinhibition of Ca2+-ATPase of SR leads to faster Ca2+ uptake into the sarcoplasmic reticulum, thereby contributing to the lusitropic response elicited in heart by beta-agonists. The  protein is a key regulator of cardiac diastolic function. Mutations in this gene are a cause of inherited human dilated cardiomyopathy with refractory congestive heart failure.

When phospholamban is phosphorylated by PKA, its ability to inhibit SERCA2 is lost. Thus, activators of PKA, such as the beta-adrenergic agonist epinephrine (released by sympathetic stimulation), may enhance the rate of cardiac myocyte relaxation. In addition, since SERCA2 is more active, the next action potential will cause an increased release of calcium, resulting in increased contraction (positive inotropic effect). When phospholamban is not phosphorylated, such as when PKA is inactive, it can interact with and inhibit SERCA. Thus, the overall effect of unphosphorylated phospholamban is to decrease contractility and the rate of muscle relaxation, thereby decreasing stroke volume and heart rate, respectively.

Clinical significance 

Gene knockout of phospholamban results in animals with  hyperdynamic hearts, with little apparent negative consequence.

Mutations in this gene are a cause of inherited human dilated cardiomyopathy with refractory congestive heart failure.

Discovery 

Phospholamban was discovered by Arnold Martin Katz and coworkers in 1974.

Interactions 

PLN has been shown to interact with SLN and SERCA1.

References

External links 
PDBe-KB provides an overview of all the structure information available in the PDB for Human Cardiac phospholamban

Protein domains
Single-pass transmembrane proteins